The 2005 mid-year rugby union tests (also known as the Summer Internationals in the Northern Hemisphere) refers to the Rugby union Test matches played during between May and July in 2005. It will coincide with the 2005 British & Irish Lions tour to New Zealand, playing a 3-test tour against New Zealand. Wales toured North America, playing against Canada and the United States, while Ireland played two tests against Japan.

Scotland played one test against Romania due to the Lions tour, while Italy played two tests against Argentina and a single test against Australia. France toured South Africa for two tests before playing a single test against Australia. Ahead of the Lions series, New Zealand played Fiji as a warm-up, while Australia warmed-up against Samoa ahead of the French and Italian clashes. In addition to these two tier 2 sides, Japan played Argentina and Uruaguy losing both matches before the Irish test series.

Overview

Series

Other tours

Matches

Week 1

Week 2

Week 3

Week 4

Week 5

Week 6

Week 7

Week 8

Week 9

Week 10

See also
Mid-year rugby union test series
2005 end-of-year rugby union tests
2005 British & Irish Lions tour to New Zealand
2005 Churchill Cup

References

External links
http://www.rugbydata.com

2005
2004–05 in European rugby union
2005–06 in European rugby union
2005 in Oceanian rugby union
2005 in North American rugby union
2005 in South American rugby union
2005 in South African rugby union
2004–05 in Japanese rugby union